Fancy Cherono (born 2 August 2001) is a Kenyan athlete. She competed in the women's 3000 metres steeplechase event at the 2019 World Athletics Championships.

References

External links
 

 

2001 births
Living people
Kenyan female middle-distance runners
Kenyan female steeplechase runners
Place of birth missing (living people)
World Athletics Championships athletes for Kenya
Athletes (track and field) at the 2018 Summer Youth Olympics
Athletes (track and field) at the 2018 African Youth Games
Youth Olympic gold medalists for Kenya
Youth Olympic gold medalists in athletics (track and field)
21st-century Kenyan women